Runge may refer to:

Locations  
Runge, Texas, a town, United States
Runge (crater), a lunar crater Mare Smythii

Other uses  
Runge Newspapers, a newspaper chain in Ontario, Canada
Inspector Heinrich Runge (though it is more often spelled as "Lunge"), a character in the Monster series
Runge (surname), a surname